Macrocoma bolivari is a species of leaf beetle from Morocco. It was first described by Spanish entomologist  in 1914, as a species of Pseudocolaspis.

Subspecies
There are two subspecies of M. bolivari:

 Macrocoma bolivari antiatlantis Kocher, 1966: Described from Anti-Atlas mountains.
 Macrocoma bolivari bolivari (Escalera, 1914): The nominotypical subspecies. Common around the High Atlas range.

References

bolivari
Beetles of North Africa
Endemic fauna of Morocco
Beetles described in 1914